Corbigny is a railway station in Corbigny, Bourgogne-Franche-Comté, France. The station is located on the Clamecy-Gilly-sur-Loire railway. The station is served by TER (local) services operated by the SNCF. Between 1901 and 1939 there was a metre gauge railway operating from Corbigny to Saulieu, a distance of 76 km.

Train services
The following train services serve the station as of 2022:

local service (TER Bourgogne-Franche-Comté) Laroche-Migennes - Auxerre - Corbigny

References

External links

Corbigny in 1991

Railway stations in France opened in 1878
Railway stations in Nièvre